John Jancek (born April 1, 1968) is an American college football coach and former defensive lineman. He is currently special teams coordinator at LSU.  He is married to his wife Kelly Jancek.  Jancek has four sons Brady, Jack, Brock, and Zac.

Playing career
Jancek was a defensive lineman for the Grand Valley State Lakers from 1988 through 1990.

Coaching career
Jancek started his coaching career after his playing days ended following the 1990 season. In 1991, he stayed at Grand Valley State as a graduate assistant. In 1992, he left for Wayne State in Detroit, Michigan to be their defensive coordinator. He remained at Wayne State until 1994, when he left for Hillsdale College to take on the same role. In 1999, he returned to Grand Valley State to be their defensive coordinator. He left for Central Michigan in 2002 to be their defensive line coach. In 2005, he joined the Georgia Bulldogs coaching staff as the linebackers coach. In 2009, he was promoted to co-defensive coordinator. In 2010, he left for the same role at Cincinnati. In 2012, he became the sole defensive coordinator for the Bearcats. In 2013, he returned to the SEC, this time as the Tennessee defensive coordinator, where he stayed until the 2015 season. He left for South Florida in 2016, where he was the safeties coach. In 2017, he joined the Kentucky Wildcats as a defensive consultant. In 2018, he was named as the Colorado State Rams' defensive coordinator. Following the last game of the 2019 season, Bobo left the head coach position at CSU and Steve Addazio was hired to be the new head coach of CSU, leaving Jancek and his position in question.  In 2020, Jancek was brought on as a defensive quality control coach for Kirby Smart and the Georgia Bulldogs football program. Jancek was part of the Bulldogs' staff that won the National Championship in the 2021 season over Alabama

Personal life
Jancek and his wife, Kelly, have four sons, Zac, Brock, Jack, and Brady. Zac currently is a defensive analyst for the Arkansas State Red Wolves football team.  Jack currently is a wide receiver for the Tennessee Volunteers football team.

References

External links
 Georgia Bulldogs bio
 Cincinnati Bearcats bio

1968 births
Living people
Grand Valley State Lakers football coaches
Wayne State Warriors football coaches
Central Michigan Chippewas football coaches
Georgia Bulldogs football coaches
Cincinnati Bearcats football coaches
Tennessee Volunteers football coaches
South Florida Bulls football coaches
Kentucky Wildcats football coaches
Colorado State Rams football coaches
Sportspeople from Muskegon, Michigan